Humularia is a genus of flowering plants in the legume family, Fabaceae. It belongs to the subfamily Faboideae, and was recently assigned to the informal monophyletic Dalbergia clade of the Dalbergieae.

Species
Humularia comprises the following species:

 Humularia affinis (De Wild.) P.A. Duvign.
 Humularia anceps P.A. Duvign.
 Humularia apiculata (De Wild.) P.A. Duvign.

 Humularia bequaertii (De Wild.) P.A. Duvign.

 Humularia bifoliolata (Micheli) P.A. Duvign.
 Humularia callensii P.A. Duvign.
 Humularia chevalieri (De Wild.) P.A. Duvign.
 Humularia ciliato-denticulata (De Wild.) P.A. Duvign.
 Humularia corbisieri (De Wild.) P.A. Duvign.
 Humularia descampsii (De Wild. & T. Durand) P.A. Duvign.
 Humularia drepanocephala (Baker) P.A. Duvign.
 Humularia duvigneaudii Symoens
 Humularia elegantula P.A. Duvign.
 Humularia elisabethvilleana (De Wild.) P.A. Duvign.
 Humularia flabelliformis P.A. Duvign.
 Humularia kapiriensis (De Wild.) P.A. Duvign.
 Humularia kassneri (De Wild.) P.A. Duvign.
 Humularia katangensis (De Wild.) P.A. Duvign.
 Humularia ledermannii (De Wild.) P.A. Duvign.

 Humularia magnistipulata Torre

 Humularia mendoncae (Baker) P.A. Duvign.
 Humularia meyeri-johannis (Harms & De Wild.) P.A. Duvign.
 Humularia minima (Hutch.) P.A. Duvign.
 Humularia multifoliolata Verdc.
 Humularia pseudaeschynomene Verdc.

 Humularia renieri (De Wild.) P.A. Duvign.

 Humularia rosea (De Wild.) P.A. Duvign.

 Humularia submarginalis Verdc.
 Humularia sudanica P.A. Duvign.
 Humularia tenuis P.A. Duvign.
 Humularia upembae P.A. Duvign.
 Humularia welwitschii (Taub.) P.A. Duvign.
 Humularia wittei P.A. Duvign.

References

Dalbergieae
Fabaceae genera